MetaSynth is a sound design and music production tool developed by U&I Software for the Macintosh operating system, that allows the creation of sound from images.  It was most notably used on The Matrix (for bullet-speed special effects), but has also appeared on the electronic artist Aphex Twin's single "Windowlicker" in the title track and the B-side track "ΔMi−1 = −αΣn=1NDi[n][Σj∈C[i]Fji[n − 1] + Fexti[n−1]]."

Awards 
 Electronic Musician 2006 Editor's Choice Award for Best Sound-design Application 
 Electronic Musician 1999 Editor's Choice Award
 Keyboard Magazine Key Buy Award (April '98 and July '00)
 MacWorld Eddy Nomination, TEC award nomination
 Musician Magazine Editor's Pick (1999)

References

External links 
 Electronic Musician review

Classic Mac OS software